Kanchanjangha: Rise is a 2019 Indian Assamese-language action drama film directed by Zubeen Garg and produced by Zubeen Garg and Garima Saikia Garg under the banner of "Eye Creation Productions". The film features Zubeen Garg in lead role and Pabitra Rabha, Pinky Sharma, Sasanka Samir in supporting roles. Zubeen Garg wrote the story and screenplay for the film.

Cast
 Zubeen Garg as Anirban Bhattacharya
 Pinky Sharma as Panchana
 Sasanka Samir as Samir
 Pabitra Rabha as Pabitra
 Jerina Baruah as Antara, Anirban's sister 
 Tridip Lahon
 Atanu Bhuyan as an Officer in Assam Public Service Commission
 Tanaya Nandi
 Runu Devi
 Rohan Gautam, debeswar hazarika

Box office
Kanchanjangha was released on 6 September in 69 theatres of Assam as well as in Hyderabad, Gujarat, Cochin and Chennai. It got an overall positive response from people. The film collected  in its first day. In the beginning of the fourth week, Kanchanjangha surpassed the record of Baahubali 2: The Conclusion, which was the highest grosser in the Northeast before this release. With this collection, it became the highest grossing Assamese film in history, exceeding the previous highest grosser, Mission China.

Soundtrack
The film contains 6 songs in its runtime. All of the songs were composed by Zubeen Garg and deemed very popular. The title song, Kanchanjangha, is a poem written by Jyotiprasad Agarwala, some parts of which have been sung as a song and others recited.

See also
Ratnakar, a film by Jatin Bora
Pratighat

References

External links 
 

2019 films
2010s Assamese-language films
Films about the education system in India
Films about examinations and testing
Films about academic scandals
State public service commissions of India
Northeast Indian films